Michael Funke (born 26 September 1969 in Meerbusch) is a German auto racing driver.

Career
Funke finished third in the German Touring Car Challenge in 1999 and 2000, and was runner-up in 2001. The championship became the DMSB Produktionswagen Meisterschaft in 2004, and Funke finished third for Hotfiel Sport.

Hotfiel moved to the new World Touring Car Championship in 2005, and Funke was test and reserve driver. He replaced Thomas Jäger for the final five rounds of the season, scoring a best finish of tenth position.

Funke has since competed in ADAC GT Masters.

Racing record

Complete World Touring Car Championship results
(key) (Races in bold indicate pole position) (Races in italics indicate fastest lap)

References

External links

Living people
1969 births
People from Rhein-Kreis Neuss
Sportspeople from Düsseldorf (region)
Racing drivers from North Rhine-Westphalia
German racing drivers
World Touring Car Championship drivers
ADAC GT Masters drivers
European Touring Car Championship drivers
Nürburgring 24 Hours drivers